Welcome to Me is a 2014 American comedy-drama film directed by Shira Piven and written by Eliot Laurence. The film stars Kristen Wiig as Alice Klieg, a lottery winner with borderline personality disorder who uses her newfound wealth to write and star in her own syndicated talk show. The cast includes James Marsden, Linda Cardellini and Wes Bentley. The film was released on May 1, 2015 in a limited release, receiving generally positive reviews from critics.

Plot
Alice Klieg, a mentally ill single woman living on disability benefits, and fan of Oprah Winfrey, wins the California Stack Sweepstakes lottery jackpot of $86 million. She appears on the local TV news celebrating her win, but is upset when the speech she had prepared is abruptly cut off after she mentions using masturbation as a sedative. She discontinues her medication, against the advice of her psychiatrist, Daryl Moffat, and moves into a casino hotel with her best friend Gina Selway.

During a vitamin supplement infomercial presented by Gabe Ruskin, Alice, who is in the studio audience, responds to his request for a volunteer, hijacks the broadcast and tries to recite her speech once again (although is again cut off by the director). Gabe's brother Rich, the co-owner and manager of the studio, introduces himself and arranges a meeting to discuss Alice's idea for a TV show, at which Alice writes a check for $15 million to pay for 100 live-broadcast two-hour episodes of a vanity show about herself entitled Welcome to Me.

Gabe is nonplussed over the show's aimless premise, but after Alice takes him on a date, they promptly have sex and begin a relationship. During the first episode: Alice announces that she has given up her medication, includes a silent five-minute segment of her eating meatloaf cake with mashed sweet potato icing, and a live re-enactment of a scene from her past (with actors wearing name-cards playing herself and a friend who had betrayed her in high school).

After seeing a recording, Alice decides the show looks too inexpensive and writes another check to bring the production values more in line with The Oprah Winfrey Show. The studio set is revamped to include a rotating stage and a replica of her house.

As the show grows in popularity, her friends and family become alienated by her non-flattering depictions of them in her sketches. Rainer Ybarra, a graduate student and fan of the show, interviews Alice about her rising stardom, and the two go on a date which ends with her fellating him in her limousine. Their tryst is revealed on air, much to Gabe's fury.

While recovering from burns sustained in a cooking accident on the show, Alice decides to introduce a new theme of neutering dogs on the show, utilizing her six years' experience as a veterinary nurse. Fed up with her volatility, Gabe finally quits.

Rich continues to support Alice's decisions until he and the studio are threatened with various lawsuits including slander and health code violations. Rich angrily interrupts the show, demanding that Alice should cancel the veterinary procedures. Alice abandons the broadcast 40 minutes early, cancels her show and settles the lawsuits, leaving her with $7 million.

Alice suffers a nervous breakdown, walking naked through the main floor of the casino. She is hospitalized and resumes her medication. After being released, she apologizes to Dr. Moffat and contacts Rich to arrange a final episode of Welcome to Me. She invites her family and Gina to the broadcast, a lavish telethon aimed at finding owners for her dogs which she has neutered, along with making amends to everyone she has wronged. In the show's last moments, Alice gives a heartfelt apology to Gina and praises her for her patience, presenting her with a check for the remaining $7 million of her lottery winnings.

Her life now back to normal, Gabe takes Alice home and gives her a camcorder as a gift. When she goes to bed, she finally turns off her television that she had left switched on continuously for over 11 years.

Cast

Production

On March 20, 2013, Kristen Wiig was in talks to join the cast of the film and re-team with Anchorman 2: The Legend Continues cohorts Will Ferrell and Adam McKay, who produced. On May 21, 2013, it was announced that Wiig had signed to star in the film. On July 16, 2013, more actors were added to the cast including Linda Cardellini, Tim Robbins and Jennifer Jason Leigh. On July 29, 2013, four more actors were added to the cast, Wes Bentley, James Marsden, Joan Cusack, and Alan Tudyk. On December 3, 2014, Millennium Entertainment acquired the American distribution rights to the film.

Principal photography began in July 2013 in Los Angeles and filming mostly in Greater Los Angeles Area. The film was shot in Indio, California, filming a scene at Fantasy Springs Resort Casino hotel. The crew also filmed scenes in Inland Empire, Banning, Beaumont and Cabazon. On August 14, filming took place in Palm Springs.

Release
The film premiered at the 2014 Toronto International Film Festival on September 5, 2014.

Box office
It was released in United States theaters on May 1, 2015. The film grossed $38,168 from 2 screens. The following week the film jumped from 41st place to 29th place, earning $188,067 from 133 screens. The film closed with $636,819 after spending seven weeks in the box office.

Home media
The film was also released on May 8, 2015 through Hoopla, an online streaming media service used by libraries. This was the first time a first-run film was released simultaneously in theaters and on Hoopla. The film was also released on video on demand and digital stores as well beginning on May 8, 2015.

The film was released on DVD and Blu-ray on June 16, 2015 in the United States.

Reception
On Rotten Tomatoes, the film received a rating of 74%, based on 108 reviews, with a rating of 6.46/10. The site's critical consensus reads, "A transfixing central performance by Kristen Wiig holds Welcome to Me together and compensates for its uneven stretches." On Metacritic, the film has a score of 69 out of 100, based on 29 critics, indicating "generally favorable reviews".

In his New York Times review, A.O. Scott wrote that "By turns touching, amusing and genuinely disturbing, [Welcome To Me] defies expectations and easy categorization, forgoing obvious laughs and cheap emotional payoffs in favor of something much odder and more interesting."

References

External links
 
 
 
 

2014 films
2014 comedy-drama films
2014 independent films
American comedy-drama films
Borderline personality disorder in fiction
Films shot in Los Angeles
Films shot in California
Vertigo Films films
Bron Studios films
Gary Sanchez Productions films
Films set in Los Angeles
Films about television
2010s English-language films
2010s American films